Kibaya is a town and a ward in the Manyara Region of Tanzania. It is the district headquarter of Kiteto District. 

According to the 2012 census, the population of Kibaya is 8,759.

References

Populated places in Manyara Region
Wards of Manyara Region